Mylohyus is an extinct genus of peccary found in North and Central America. It first evolved during the Late Miocene and became extinct at the end of the Pleistocene, around 12,000 years ago.

Six species were known, the most famous being Mylohyus nasutus, also known as the long-nosed peccary.

Isotope and anatomical studies have suggested that the diet of Mylohyus varied over geological time, from being primarily a C3 browser during the Blancan, with an increasing consumption of C4 vegetation during the Irvingtonian, with a relatively even mixture of C3 and C4 during the Rancholabrean. Suggestions have been made that it was frugivorous and also consumed hard browse like twigs.

Sources

External links
Explore the Ice Age Midwest - Long-nosed Peccary
Zipcodezoo - Mylohyus (Genus)

Pliocene even-toed ungulates
Pliocene mammals of North America
Pleistocene even-toed ungulates
Pleistocene mammals of North America
Pliocene first appearances
Holocene extinctions
Fossil taxa described in 1860
Taxa named by Joseph Leidy
Prehistoric even-toed ungulate genera